The Sacrifice is a 1909 American silent short drama film directed by D. W. Griffith.

Cast
 Harry Solter as Mr. Hardluck
 Florence Lawrence as Mrs. Hardluck
 Linda Arvidson as At Wigmakers
 John R. Cumpson as At Jewelers
 George Gebhardt as At Jewelers / At Pawnshop
 Arthur V. Johnson as At Wigmakers
 Marion Leonard as At Wigmakers
 Owen Moore
 Mack Sennett as At Wigmakers / At Jewelers / At Pawnshop

References

External links
 

1909 films
1909 drama films
1909 short films
Silent American drama films
American silent short films
American black-and-white films
Films directed by D. W. Griffith
1900s American films